Chu Hung-sen (born 23 March 1978 in Taiwan) is a Taiwanese baseball player who currently plays for Brother Elephants of Chinese Professional Baseball League. He currently plays as second baseman for the Elephants.

Career statistics

See also
 Chinese Professional Baseball League
 Brother Elephants

References

External links
 

1978 births
Living people
Brother Elephants players
Baseball players from Taipei